
Year 844 (DCCCXLIV) was a leap year starting on Tuesday (link will display the full calendar) of the Julian calendar.

Events 
 By place 

 Byzantine Empire 
 Spring – Battle of Mauropotamos: A Byzantine expedition under Theoktistos is sent to Anatolia (modern Turkey), against the Muslim Arabs of the Abbasid Caliphate, who have raided the Byzantine themes of Cappadocia, Anatolikon, Boukellarion, and Opsikion. The Byzantines are defeated, and many of the officers defect to the Arabs. 

 Europe 
 Viking raiders ascend the River Garonne as far as the city of Toulouse, and pillage the lands of Septimania. Part of the marauding Vikings invades Galicia (Northern Spain), where some perish in a storm at sea. After being defeated in Corunna, the Scandinavian raiders sack the Umayyad cities of Seville (see below), Niebla, Beja, and Lisbon.
 Summer – King Charles the Bald struggles against the repeated rebellions in Aquitaine, and against the Bretons in West Francia. He besieges Bernard I at the Battle of Toulouse, while Duke Nominoe raids into Maine, and plunders other Frankish territory.
 June 15 – Louis II, eldest son of Emperor Lothair I, is crowned king at Rome by Pope Sergius II, and becomes co-ruler of Middle Francia, and over Lombardy, Friuli, and Tuscany in Italy.
 September 25–November 11 or 17 – Viking raid on Seville (844): Vikings arrive in Seville by the Guadalquivir, taking the city on October 1 or 3 and pillaging it; but are expelled by forces of the Emirate of Córdoba.

 Britain 
 King Æthelred II of Northumbria is expelled from his kingdom by Rædwulf, who takes the throne. Rædwulf is later killed in battle against the Vikings, along with many of his noblemen. Æthelred returns and claims his right to rule.
 King Merfyn Frych dies after a 24-year reign. He is succeeded by his son Rhodri Mawr ("the Great"), who becomes ruler of Gwynedd (Wales).

 By topic 

 Religion 
 January 25 – Pope Gregory IV dies after a 16-year reign, in which he has supported the Frankish policy of late emperor Louis the Pious, and established the observance of All Saints' Day. He is succeeded by Sergius II, as the 102nd pope of Rome. Sergius imprisons the antipope John VIII, and is elected by popular acclamation.

Births 
 Abdullah ibn Muhammad al-Umawi, Muslim emir (d. 912)
 Al-Mu'tamid, Muslim caliph (d. 892)
 Hasan al-Utrush, Muslim emir (approximate date)
 Sosei, Japanese waka poet (approximate date)
 Yu Xuanji, Chinese poet (approximate date)

Deaths 
 January 11 – Michael I, former Byzantine emperor
 January 25 – Gregory IV, pope of the Catholic Church
 Abdallah ibn Tahir, Muslim governor (or 845)
 Abu Ja'far Ashinas, Muslim general
 Alberik II, Frankish bishop
 Bera, count of Barcelona
 Bernard II, count of Poitiers 
 Bernard I, duke of Septimania
 Chen Yixing, chancellor of the Tang Dynasty
 Ekkehard, Frankish nobleman
 Galindo Garcés, count of Aragon
 Hugh, illegitimate son of Charlemagne (b. 802)
 Merfyn Frych, king of Gwynedd (Wales)
 Mukhariq, Abbasid court singer
 Nithard, Frankish historian 
 Rædwulf, king of Northumbria (approximate date)
 Tachibana no Hayanari, Japanese calligrapher (d. 782)
 Theodrada, Frankrish princess and abbess (or 853)

References

Sources